Chen Tao (born 16 December 1972) is a Chinese boxer. He competed in the men's middleweight event at the 1996 Summer Olympics.

References

1972 births
Living people
Chinese male boxers
Olympic boxers of China
Boxers at the 1996 Summer Olympics
Place of birth missing (living people)
Asian Games medalists in boxing
Boxers at the 1994 Asian Games
Asian Games bronze medalists for China
Medalists at the 1994 Asian Games
Middleweight boxers
20th-century Chinese people